Mata ki Chowki is an Indian television series produced by Swastik Pictures, which aired on Sahara One from 9 June 2008 to 7 October 2011. The series produced 845 episodes.

Plot 
Mata ki Chowki follows the story of a girl known as Vaishnavi, a great devotee of the Goddess Vaishno Devi, and details events in her life concerning her faith.

Vaishnavi is an orphan child who later finds herself adopted by Shradhha & Vidyasagar. Throughout her life, Vaishnavi's devotion towards Mata Vaishno Devi is seen in the miracles that occur in her favour and the struggles she encounters. Season 2 revolves around Vaishnavi's daughter, Sakshi. The third season covers the life of Sakshi's daughters, Nisha and Asha.

Cast
 Shantipriya as Mata Vaishno Devi.
 Ishita Vyas as Goddess Kali.
 Richa Mukherjee as Child Vaishnavi (2008).
 Sai Ballal as Pandit Vidyasagar (Vaishnavi's foster father). He is Shraddha's husband and a priest of the Maa Vaishno Devi temple in Bhadarwaan village.
 Mona Ambegaonkar as Shraddha Sagar (Vaishnavi's foster mother & Sonakshi's biological mother).
Muskaan Nancy James as Vaishnavi Sagar / Vaishnavi Vansh Kumar (Season-1). She is very innocent and a true devotee of Mata Vaishno Devi.
 Rahul Raj Singh as Vansh Kumar (Vaishnavi's Husband).
 Sudesh Berry as Sheel Kumar (Bade Papa /Prabhuji), Vansh, Yash and Gautam's father, Ambika's husband and Sabhya's elder brother.
 Sheela Sharma as Ambika Sheel Kumar (Badi Maa), Vansh, Yash and Gautam's mother.
 Tarun Khanna as Yash Kumar, the eldest son of Sheel Kumar and Gauri's father.
 Riddhima Tiwari as Arpita Yash Kumar, Gauri's mother.
 Krishna Soni as Gautam Kumar, an elder jobless son of Sheel Kumar (2008-2009).
 Minakshi Sahane as Lata Mousi (Vidyasagar's home caretaker).
 Giriraj Kabra as Madhav (Vaishnavi's silent lover).
 Zahida Parveen as Sanyukta Gautam Kumar (Badi Bhabhi), Gautam's wife and the elder daughter-in-law of Sheel Kumar.
 Bharat Kaul as Sabhya Kumar (Chhote Papa), Sheel Kumar's brother, Priyamvada's husband and Moksh's father.
 Usha Bachani as Priyamvada Sabhya Kumar (Chhoti Maa), Moksh's mother and Sabhya's wife.
 Sachal Tyagi as Moksh Kumar, Madhura's husband and Mansi and Kannu's father.
 Seema Malik as Madhura Moksh Kumar (Chhoti Bhabhi), Moksh's wife, Mansi, and Kannu's mother.
 Shaika Parveen as Sonakshi (Chulbuli) (Vaishnavi's foster sister).
 Adita Wahi as Natasha, Vansh's girlfriend and the daughter of Tantrik Baba.
 Sikandar Kharbanda as Munna Rajdan (Sanyukta's elder brother).
 Unknown child as young Sonakshi Sagar (Chhoti Chulbuli).
 Nitin Trivedi as Natasha's father / Tantrik Baba.
 Mehul Nisar as Gulfam 'Gullu' (Abdul Chacha's son). 
 Poonam Joshi as Monica, Sabhya's girlfriend. 
 Gajendra Chauhan as Narayan.
 Simran Sharma as Child Sakshi (Lt. Vansh-Vaishnavi's daughter).
 Sudha Chandran as  Mahashweta Devi/Fake Mata Rani.
 Gautam Rode as Aman (Sheel-Shweta's Illegal Son) Prabhuji's devotee.
 Chetan Hansraj / Harsh Vashisht as Rudra (Bali) Narayan (Sakshi's husband). He is Hari Narayan and Kusum's youngest son.
 Vishnu Sharma as Hari Narayan (Sakshi's father-in-law), the patriarch of the Narayan Family and a wealthy businessman.
 Shreedhara / Tiya Gandwani as Kkusumganga Hari Narayan (Sakshi's mother-in-law).
 Siddharth Dhawan as Vishnu Narayan (Sakshi's Jeth).
 Anushka Singh as Savita Vishnu Narayan (Sakshi's Jethani).
 Dhriti Bhatia as Mata Rani Baal Roop/ Chhoti Durga.
 Himani Chawla as Radha Rudra Narayan (Bali's 1st wife/Sakshi's Soutan).
 Deepti Dhyani as Maya Rudra Narayan (Bali's 2nd wife/Sakshi's Soutan).
 Sangeeta Khanayat as Asha Narayan (Sakshi's young daughter).
 Svetlana Mishra as Nisha Narayan (Sakshi's elder daughter).
 Ankit Bathla/Suman Dey as Arjun (Asha's husband).
 Anshul Singh as Shakti.
 Pankaj Kumar as Yamdev (Vaishnavi's Mahasankap track).
 Unknown person as Brahm Dev (Vaishnavi's Panch-dev Pariksha track).
 Unknown person as Mata Rani ka Kishori roop (Mrs. Sanghvi's track).
 Unknown person as Gauri Yash Kumar (Vaishnavi's Niece).
 Ashalata Wabgaonker as Dadi Maa (Sheel and Sabhya's mother, Vansh, Yash, Gautam, and Moksh's grandmother).
 Reshmi Ghosh as Nirti Maa.
 Vaidehi Dhamecha as Grown-up Mansi Moksh Kumar (Moksh and Madhura's daughter).
 Samaira Rao as Grown-up Gauri Yash Kumar (Yash and Arpita's daughter).
 Vibhuti Patil Thakur as Shyama Hari Narayan (Hari Narayan and Kusum's daughter, Vinod's wife, Rudra, Vishnu, and Dheeraj's sister).
  Paras Thukral as Vinod (Shyama's husband, Hari Narayan, and Kusum's son-in-law).
  Ritwik Dhanjani as Dheeraj Hari Narayan (Rudra and Vishnu's youngest brother).
  Neeral Bhardwaj as Bhoomi.
  Jitendra Trehan as Ram Chacha.
  Iklaq Khan as Abdul Chacha (Vidyasagar's neighbour, Gullu's father).
  Muskaan Sayed as Rajni.
 Manoj Ramola as Hari
  Phalguni Desai as Manorma Narayan, Hari Narayan's Sister.
  Unknown person as Sona (Sheel House's servant).
  Farzil Pardiwala as Devrishi Naarad.
  Unknown person as Kutilaa.
Suman Dey.

References

External links
 Sahara One Official Website

Indian television soap operas
Sahara One original programming
2008 Indian television series debuts
2011 Indian television series endings
Swastik Productions television series
Indian television series about Hindu deities